Mohammad Al Buraiki  is a Kuwaiti football midfielder who played for Kuwait in the 2004 Asian Cup. He also played for Al Salmiya.

External links

Kuwaiti footballers
1980 births
Living people
Asian Games medalists in football
Footballers at the 1998 Asian Games
Asian Games silver medalists for Kuwait
Association football midfielders
Al Salmiya SC players
Medalists at the 1998 Asian Games
Kuwait international footballers
Kuwait Premier League players